Vladimir Vinek (3 December 1897 – 1945) was a Croatian footballer. He competed in the men's tournament at the 1924 Summer Olympics.

International career
He made his debut for the Kingdom of Yugoslavia in a June 1922 friendly match against Romania and earned a total of 6 caps, scoring 3 goals. His final international was a May 1924 Olympic Games match against Uruguay.

References

External links

 Vladimir Vinek - at Serbian FA

1897 births
1945 deaths
Footballers from Zagreb
Association football forwards
Yugoslav footballers
Yugoslavia international footballers
Olympic footballers of Yugoslavia
Footballers at the 1924 Summer Olympics
HAŠK players
HŠK Concordia players